Róg may refer to:

Róg, Pomeranian Voivodeship, Poland
 Róg railway station
Róg, Warmian-Masurian Voivodeship, Poland
Róg Orłowski, Warmian-Masurian Voivodeship, Poland
Róg Osada, Pomeranian Voivodeship, Poland

Czarny Róg, Ostróda County, Warmian-Masurian Voivodeship, Poland
Czarny Róg, Pisz County, Warmian-Masurian Voivodeship, Poland
Jałowy Róg, Podlaskie Voivodeship, Poland
Jeleni Róg, Pomeranian Voivodeship, Poland
Kozi Róg, Kuyavian-Pomeranian Voivodeship, Poland
Krzywy Róg, Warmian-Masurian Voivodeship, Poland
Niedźwiedzi Róg, Warmian-Masurian Voivodeship, Poland
Ostry Róg, Warmian-Masurian Voivodeship, Poland
Suchy Róg, Warmian-Masurian Voivodeship, Poland
Twardy Róg, Podlaskie Voivodeship, Poland
Żabi Róg, Warmian-Masurian Voivodeship, Poland.